Nicholas Foligno (born October 31, 1987) is an American-Canadian professional ice hockey left winger for the Boston Bruins of the National Hockey League (NHL). He was selected in the first round, 28th overall by the Ottawa Senators during the 2006 NHL Entry Draft. Foligno was traded to the Columbus Blue Jackets six years later, and eventually was named the team's captain for six seasons.

His father, Mike Foligno, is a veteran of over 1000 career NHL games. His brother, Marcus Foligno, currently plays for the Minnesota Wild.

Playing career

Amateur
As a youth, Foligno played in the 2000 and 2001 Quebec International Pee-Wee Hockey Tournaments with a minor ice hockey team from Hershey, Pennsylvania.

Foligno began the 2003–04 season with the USA Hockey National Team Development Program's under-17 team, where he had seven goals and 16 points. He moved up to the under-18 team, which at the time played in the North American Hockey League (NAHL), where in 43 games, Foligno scored eight goals and 20 points. In seven playoff games, Foligno had two goals and three points.

Foligno appeared in four games with the under-18 team in 2004–05, getting two goals and an assist.

After his tenure with the Development Program, Foligno joined the Sudbury Wolves of the Ontario Hockey League (OHL), who were coached by his father, Mike Foligno. In his rookie season in 2004–05, Foligno had ten goals and 38 points in 65 games. He played his first game with the Wolves on September 24, 2004, earning no points in a 3–1 win over the Ottawa 67's. Foligno registered his first OHL point, an assist, in a 6–1 win over the Erie Otters on September 26, 2004. It took Foligno 23 games, but he scored his first career OHL goal on November 20, 2004, beating Kitchener Rangers goaltender Dan Turple in a 6–3 loss. In the playoffs, Foligno had five goals and ten points in 12 games, as Sudbury lost to the Ottawa 67's in the second round of the playoffs.

Foligno saw his offensive production increase during his second season with the Wolves in 2005–06, as he led the club with 70 points, scoring 24 goals and 46 assists, while registering 146 penalty minutes, helping the Wolves to the post-season. In ten playoff games, Foligno had a goal and four points as Sudbury was swept by the Peterborough Petes in the second round.

Foligno returned to the Wolves for a third season in 2006–07, as he scored a team high 31 goals and 88 points in 66 games, helping Sudbury clinch a playoff berth. In the post-season, he scored 12 goals and 29 points in 21 games to finish with the second highest point total in the League; Sudbury, however, lost to the Plymouth Whalers in six games in the J. Ross Robertson Cup finals.

Ottawa Senators

The Ottawa Senators selected Foligno with the 28th overall pick in the 2006 NHL Entry Draft held in Vancouver, British Columbia. On March 21, 2007, Senators General Manager John Muckler announced that the team and Foligno agreed to a three-year, entry level contract. He spent some time with the Binghamton Senators of the American Hockey League (AHL) during the 2007–08 season, appearing in 28 games, scoring six goals and 19 points. He earned his first AHL point in his first game on November 16, 2007, an assist in a 6–3 loss to the Philadelphia Phantoms. Foligno scored his first AHL goal on January 18, 2008, scoring on Adam Munro of the Syracuse Crunch in a 6–3 win.

Foligno spent most of the 2007–08 with the Ottawa Senators. He began the season with Ottawa and played in his first game on October 3, 2007, earning no points in 7:36 ice time in a 4–3 victory over the Toronto Maple Leafs.  Foligno scored his first career NHL goal and point on October 18, 2007, as he beat Carey Price of the Montreal Canadiens in a 4–3 Senators win. When he scored the goal, he performed his father Mike Foligno's noted goal celebration, the "Foligno Leap." Foligno finished the season appearing in 45 games with Ottawa, scoring six goals and nine points. He appeared in his first Stanley Cup playoff game on April 9, 2008, in a 4–0 loss to the Pittsburgh Penguins. On April 14, 2008, he scored his first career playoff goal, beating the Penguins' Marc-André Fleury in a 4–1 Senators loss. The Senators were ultimately swept in four-straight games in the Eastern Conference Quarterfinals; Foligno's goal was his only registered point of the series.

Foligno spent the entire 2008–09 season in the NHL with the Senators, scoring 17 goals and 32 points in 81 games. The Senators, however, struggled throughout the season and failed to make the 2009 playoffs.

In the 2009–10 season, Foligno missed 21 games due to injuries, including a broken leg suffered from blocking a shot in a game against the Montreal Canadiens on January 30, 2010. He scored nine goals and 26 points in 61 games he appeared in. The Senators qualified for the 2010 playoffs, and in six games, Foligno had one assist as Ottawa again fell to the Pittsburgh Penguins in the Eastern Conference Quarterfinals.
Foligno appeared in all 82 games in the 2010–11 season for Ottawa, scoring 14 goals and 34 points. The team, however, failed to make the playoffs for the second time in three seasons. Foligno put up his best offensive numbers during the subsequent 2011–12 season, registering 15 goals and 47 points while again playing in all of Ottawa's 82 regular season games.

Columbus Blue Jackets
On July 1, 2012, Foligno was traded to the Columbus Blue Jackets in exchange for defenseman Marc Methot. Having lost two of their starting six defensemen via free agency, Ottawa desperately needed to acquire a defenseman and Methot fit the bill for the Sens. Foligno had earlier been offered to Columbus as part of a package for superstar Rick Nash; however, Blue Jackets General Manager Scott Howson informed the Senators that Nash was unwilling to accept a trade to Ottawa. Five days after acquiring him, Columbus signed Foligno to a three-year contract worth a reported $9.15 million; Foligno had been a restricted free agent.

Foligno scored a notable goal in Game 4 of the Eastern Conference Quarterfinals in the 2014 playoffs against the Pittsburgh Penguins — Blue Jackets forward R. J. Umberger blocked a slapshot with his head, whereupon Foligno picked up the puck, skated down the ice and shot a knuckle-puck past goaltender Marc-André Fleury for the come-from-behind overtime winner.

In 2015, Foligno was selected by the NHL general managers to represent Columbus, in addition to Blue Jackets teammates Ryan Johansen and Sergei Bobrovsky, at the 2015 NHL All-Star Game, held in Columbus, Ohio. Foligno was additionally named a captain for one of the teams during the Game, Team Foligno. His team lost to Team Toews 17–12.

On April 4, 2015, Foligno scored his first career NHL hat-trick against the Pittsburgh Penguins. On May 20, shortly after the end of the 2014–15 season, Foligno was named captain of the Blue Jackets, filling a vacancy existent since previous team captain Rick Nash's departure to the New York Rangers in the 2012 off-season. Foligno became the sixth captain in Blue Jackets' history. The captaincy came after Foligno posted career-highs in goals (31) and points (73) from 79 regular season games played, ranking tenth in the League in the latter statistic, points. 

On February 25, 2016, in a game against the New Jersey Devils, Foligno recorded 4 points, including his second career hat trick, and leading the Blue Jackets to a 6–1 victory.

On November 9, 2019, Foligno was assessed a major penalty and game misconduct for elbowing Colorado Avalanche forward Pierre-Édouard Bellemare. He was suspended three games for the incident.

On February 7, 2021, in a regular season game against the Carolina Hurricanes, Foligno scored his 200th career goal.

Toronto Maple Leafs
On April 11, 2021, one day before the NHL trade deadline and in the final year of his contract with a Blue Jackets team expected to miss the postseason, Foligno was involved in a three-team trade to eventually end up with the Toronto Maple Leafs. To make the trade work, he was initially dealt to the San Jose Sharks in exchange for forward Stefan Noesen, with Columbus retaining 50% of his salary. Shortly after, Foligno was dealt to Toronto in exchange for a fourth-round pick in 2021, where San Jose retained 50% of Foligno's remaining salary (or 25% of his overall cap hit). Afterwards, Noesen was traded to the Maple Leafs, with Columbus receiving a first-round pick in 2021 and a fourth-round pick in 2022, as the compensation for Foligno.

Foligno's short tenure in Toronto was marred with injury. He missed several games between the trade and end of the regular season with injury, although picked up four assists in seven appearances. Again limited by injury, Foligno appeared in four of the team's seven playoff games, collecting one assist and having relatively little on-ice impact, although was involved in a notable fight with Corey Perry after Perry concussed captain John Tavares.

Boston Bruins
Although there was mutual interest between Foligno and the Maple Leafs in signing a new contract, on July 28, 2021, Foligno signed as a free agent to a two-year, $7.6 million contract with the Boston Bruins. On April 2nd, 2022, Nick played in his 1,000th NHL game, a Bruins 5-2 home victory over his former team Columbus. Foligno was placed on waivers by the Bruins on October 9, 2022, but was brought back to the team for the 2022-23 season after going unclaimed.

International play
Foligno represented the United States in the 2009 IIHF World Championship held in Switzerland. In nine games, he had two assists as the USA finished in fourth place, losing 4–2 to Sweden in the bronze medal game. Foligno again represented the U.S. in the 2010 IIHF World Championship in Germany, and in six games, he scored three goals. The United States struggled in the tournament, finishing in 13th place.

Personal life
Born in the United States to Canadian parents, Foligno has dual Canadian-American citizenship. At the time of his birth, his father, Mike, played for the Buffalo Sabres and the family resided in the Buffalo area. Although his brother Marcus has represented Canada internationally, Nick has chosen to represent the United States.

Nick Foligno's younger brother, Marcus, was drafted by the Sabres in the 2009 NHL Entry Draft. He currently plays for the Minnesota Wild. The two brothers also have two sisters, Lisa and Cara. In the summer of 2009, Foligno lost his mother, Janis, to breast cancer. He is an avid supporter of cancer patient care and research at Roger's House, the Children's Hospital of Eastern Ontario Foundation, the Ottawa Regional Cancer Foundation and the Ottawa Hospital Foundation. Foligno is also the "Celebrity Chair" of Cystic Fibrosis Canada's Ottawa Chapter, where he and his wife Janelle are very active participants.

Foligno and his wife, Janelle have three children. The family resides in Upper Arlington, Ohio He  also resides in Sudbury, Ontario during the off-season, where his father Mike was born and raised. He is a devout Catholic and speaks openly about his faith. On October 11, 2016, Foligno and his wife donated $1 million to Nationwide Children's Hospital and Boston Children's Hospital, the same facilities that took care of their daughter's heart defects when she was a newborn.

Foligno has traditionally worn jersey number 71, an inversion of the number 17 his father wore for most of his NHL career (although Mike did wear 71 while playing for the Toronto Maple Leafs). However, as fellow Bruins left winger Taylor Hall has already been wearing #71 as a Bruins player, Foligno chose to wear his #17 as his father did as an NHL player - the same number former Bruins power forward Milan Lucic wore through the 2014-15 season, and later worn by former Bruins forward Ryan Donato.

Career statistics

Regular season and playoffs

International

Awards and honors

References

External links

 
 Foligno player profile at Hockeysfuture.com

1987 births
Living people
American men's ice hockey centers
American sportspeople of Canadian descent
Binghamton Senators players
Boston Bruins players
Catholics from New York (state)
Columbus Blue Jackets players
Ice hockey people from Ontario
King Clancy Memorial Trophy winners
Ice hockey people from Buffalo, New York
National Hockey League All-Stars
National Hockey League first-round draft picks
Ottawa Senators draft picks
Ottawa Senators players
Sportspeople from Greater Sudbury
Sudbury Wolves players
Toronto Maple Leafs players
USA Hockey National Team Development Program players